Ustka Lighthouse (Polish: Latarnia Morska Ustka) is a lighthouse located in Ustka (formerly Stolpmünde), on the Polish coast of the Baltic Sea.

The lighthouse is located in between the Jarosławiec Lighthouse and the Czołpino Lighthouse.

History 
The lighthouse stands at the base of the eastern breakwater of Ustka's harbour – protecting the port's entrance way. Ustka was a very important coastal town for the nearby Słupsk – for transportation of goods and Baltic travel. In 1871 a mast was constructed  nearby the harbour's admiralty station; powered by an oil lamp on the mast. It shone with a red light and was visible at a distance of 6 nautical miles. Later on, light was elevated to a height of 11.6 metres – when shortly afterwards, since the building of a new red brick harbour admiralty station, an octagonal lighthouse was constructed in the western side of the building. It was only in 1904 when the character of the light was changed to white and intermittent. Currently the lighthouse is open to the public and the view gallery at the top of the lighthouse can be reached by a concrete and metal staircase.

Technical data 
 Light characteristic
 Light: 4 s.
 Darkness: 2 s.
 Period: 6 s.

See also 

 List of lighthouses in Poland

References

External links 

 Urząd Morski w Słupsku  
 Latarnia morska (Ustka)  na portalu polska-org.pl

Lighthouses completed in 1892
Resort architecture in Pomerania
Lighthouses in Poland
Tourist attractions in Pomeranian Voivodeship